The team event in figure skating at the 2022 Winter Olympics was held on 4, 6, and 7 February, at the Capital Indoor Stadium in Haidian District of Beijing.

The 2018 team event gold was won by Canada, with the Russian Olympic Committee placing second, and the United States placing third. Canadian 2018 Olympic champion Eric Radford returned, but this time he competed with a new partner Vanessa James.

In 2022, the Russian Olympic Committee entered the team event as the favorite, with the United States, Canada, and Japan also expected to be in medal contention. The Russian Olympic Committee decided to enter their top skaters for both the short program and free skating and won the event nine points ahead of the United States, who took silver. Japan won the bronze medal.

The medal ceremony originally scheduled for Tuesday, 8 February, was delayed over what International Olympic Committee (IOC) spokesperson Mark Adams described as a situation that required "legal consultation" with the International Skating Union. Several media outlets reported on Wednesday that the issue was over a positive test, held in December 2021, for trimetazidine by the ROC's Kamila Valieva, which was officially confirmed on February 11. The results are pending investigation. The Russian Anti-Doping Agency (RUSADA), under suspension from the World Anti-Doping Agency (WADA) since 2015 for its years of serving solely to hide the positive doping results of Russian athletes, cleared Valieva on February 9, a day after the December test results were released, two months after the test. The IOC, WADA, and International Skating Union (ISU) are appealing RUSADA's decision.

On February 14, the Court of Arbitration for Sport (CAS) ruled that Valieva should be allowed to compete in the women’s single event, deciding that preventing her from competing "would cause her irreparable harm in the circumstances", though her gold medal in the team event was still under consideration. The favorable decision from the court was made in part due to her age, as minor athletes are subject to different rules than adult athletes. The IOC announced that the medal ceremony would not take place until the investigation is over and there is a concrete decision whether to strip Russia of their medals.

In mid-November, WADA requested that CAS take up the review of the Valieva case with an eye towards a 4-year suspension of Valieva, which would exclude her from competition at the next Winter Olympics, and to rescind her first place performance at the previous Beijing Olympics because, "the Russian Anti-Doping Agency (RUSADA) did not meet a WADA-imposed Nov. 4 deadline to deliver a verdict on Valiyeva's case."

Under IOC rules, the medals will be awarded as if it was a reallocation ceremony.  Based on the exhaustion of all appeals, the IOC could hold the ceremony at Gangneung Ice Arena during the 2024 Winter Youth Olympics in PyeongChang, South Korea (the preferred time per IOC rules), Mediolanum Forum during the 2026 Winter Olympics, the IOC headquarters or Olympic Museum in Lausanne, or the 2024 World Figure Skating Championships, scheduled for Centre Bell in Montreal, Quebec, Canada.

Timeline
All times are (UTC+8).

Qualification

On the issue of the disqualification of participating athletes at the Winter Olympics, the ISU has issued a statement regarding its policy regarding doping violations which may be alleged for the duration of the events of the Games stating that the “International Skating Union cannot disclose any information about a possible anti-doping rule violation. This is regulated by the ISU anti-doping rules and the IOC anti-doping rules for the Beijing 2022 Olympics.”

Entries
Member nations submitted the following entries:

Results
All events involving the ROC are subject to review pending the outcome of an investigation left as on-going at the time of the close of the Beijing Olympics which resulted after one of the Russian skaters testing positive as reported after the start of the Olympic Games. The results of the on-going investigation could lead to vindication of the results, or, to general disqualification if the results of the women's competition need to be removed from the cumulative team scores used to decide the order in the awards standings.

Short programs/rhythm dance

Men
The men's short program was held on 4 February 2022.

Pairs
The pairs short program was held on 4 February 2022.

Ice dance
The ice dance rhythm dance was held on 4 February 2022.

Women
The women's short program was held on 6 February 2022.

Free skates/dance

Men
The men's free skate was held on 6 February 2022.

Pairs
The pairs free skate was held on 7 February 2022.

Ice dance
The ice dance free dance was held on 7 February 2022.

Women
The women's free skate was held on 7 February 2022.

Overall

Team overall
The top five teams at the end of the short programs/rhythm dance advanced to the free skates/dance.

Notes

References

Figure skating at the 2022 Winter Olympics
Mixed events at the 2022 Winter Olympics